"Lückentheorie" (gap theory) refers to the theory that when the Crown and the Parliament were unable to come to agreement, the Crown could act as it sees fit. It was in reference to the Constitution of the Kingdom of Prussia, which was established following the revolutions of 1848. Its political use occurred in 1862 when Otto von Bismarck used it to justify proceeding with taxes for military reforms over the opposition of the Parliament to avoid a constitutional crisis.

References
 Glossary from the companion website of a documentary (in German)

Politics of Prussia
1860 in Germany
19th century in Prussia
Otto von Bismarck